Ben Blackmore (born ) is an English professional rugby league footballer who plays as a er for Bradford Bulls in the Betfred Championship.

He previously played for the Castleford Tigers (Heritage No. 931) and the Huddersfield Giants in the Super League. Blackmore spent time on loan from Huddersfield at Doncaster and the Batley Bulldogs in the Championship. He has also played for Featherstone and the Sheffield Eagles in the Championship.

Background
Blackmore was born in Castleford, West Yorkshire, England.

Career
Ben hails from Castleford and has come through the ranks at Castleford Tigers.

Ben made his début against Hull F.C. in the Super League in September 2012. After the season ended, Ben signed for the Huddersfield Giants

In June 2014, he joined Featherstone Rovers for an undisclosed fee. Having had a successful spell at Featherstone Rovers, 35 games and 20 tries, Blackmore joined fellow Betfred Championship side the Sheffield Eagles. In 2019 he helped the Eagles to win the inaugural 1895 Cup as they defeated Widnes Vikings 36–18 in the final.

On 29 May 2021, it was reported that he had been handed a 10-week ban for posting a racist tweet

References

External links
Sheffield Eagles profile

1993 births
Living people
Batley Bulldogs players
Bradford Bulls players
Castleford Tigers players
Dewsbury Rams players
Doncaster R.L.F.C. players
English rugby league players
Featherstone Rovers players
Huddersfield Giants players
Rugby league centres
Rugby league players from Castleford
Rugby league wingers
Sheffield Eagles players